Hooters is the trade name of two American restaurant chains.

Hooters or Hooter may also refer to:
The Hooters, an American rock band
Hooters Casino Hotel, in Las Vegas, Nevada
Hooters Air, a defunct airline
 Miami Hooters, a defunct Arena Football League team
 An owl
 A vehicle horn
 An American slang term for large female breasts